FC Naftovyk Dolyna is a Ukrainian amateur football club based in Dolyna, Ivano-Frankivsk Oblast.

The club played in the Ivano-Frankivs'k oblast league and in the early 1990s.  They also entered the Ukrainian Amateur Championships in 1996 and finished 3rd in the final championships. The club was granted entry into the Ukrainian Professional Leagues in the next season (1997/98) they entered in the Ukrainian Second League.

The club competed from 1997 to 2008 at this level. During the winter break of the 2007–08 season the club abruptly withdrew from the competition.

The club readmitted itself to the regional competition of the oblast and has been competing there since 2009.

League and cup history

{|class="wikitable"
|-bgcolor="#efefef"
! Season
! Div.
! Pos.
! Pl.
! W
! D
! L
! GS
! GA
! P
!Domestic Cup
!colspan=2|Europe
!Notes
|-
|align=center|1997–98
|align=center|3rd "A"
|align=center|10
|align=center|34
|align=center|14
|align=center|6
|align=center|14
|align=center|35
|align=center|35
|align=center|48
|align=center|1/256 finals
|align=center|
|align=center|
|align=center|
|-
|align=center|1998–99
|align=center|3rd "A"
|align=center|9
|align=center|28
|align=center|11
|align=center|6
|align=center|11
|align=center|22
|align=center|23
|align=center|39
|align=center|1/128 finals
|align=center|
|align=center|
|align=center|
|-
|align=center|1999–00
|align=center|3rd "A"
|align=center|10
|align=center|30
|align=center|8
|align=center|12
|align=center|10
|align=center|26
|align=center|32
|align=center|36
|align=center|1/4 finals Second League Cup
|align=center|
|align=center|
|align=center|
|-
|align=center|2000–01
|align=center|3rd "A"
|align=center|13
|align=center|30
|align=center|6
|align=center|8
|align=center|16
|align=center|34
|align=center|43
|align=center|26
|align=center|1/8 finals Second League Cup
|align=center|
|align=center|
|align=center|
|-
|align=center|2001–02
|align=center|3rd "A"
|align=center|16
|align=center|36
|align=center|9
|align=center|6
|align=center|21
|align=center|20
|align=center|56
|align=center|33
|align=center|1st round
|align=center|
|align=center|
|align=center|
|-
|align=center|2002–03
|align=center|3rd "A"
|align=center|4
|align=center|28
|align=center|16
|align=center|6
|align=center|6
|align=center|35
|align=center|16
|align=center|54
|align=center|1/32 Round
|align=center|
|align=center|
|align=center|
|-
|align=center|2003–04
|align=center|3rd "A"
|align=center|9
|align=center|30
|align=center|10
|align=center|7
|align=center|13
|align=center|32
|align=center|37
|align=center|37
|align=center|1/32 finals
|align=center|
|align=center|
|align=center|
|-
|align=center|2004–05
|align=center|3rd "A"
|align=center|12
|align=center|28
|align=center|9
|align=center|3
|align=center|16
|align=center|25
|align=center|49
|align=center|30
|align=center|1/32 finals
|align=center|
|align=center|
|align=center|
|-
|align=center|2005–06
|align=center|3rd "A"
|align=center|13
|align=center|28
|align=center|8
|align=center|3
|align=center|17
|align=center|22
|align=center|45
|align=center|27
|align=center|1/16 finals
|align=center|
|align=center|
|align=center|
|-
|align=center|2006–07
|align=center|3rd "A"
|align=center|14
|align=center|28
|align=center|3
|align=center|7
|align=center|18
|align=center|14
|align=center|40
|align=center|16
|align=center|1/32 finals
|align=center|
|align=center|
|align=center|
|-
|align=center|2007–08
|align=center|3rd "A"
|align=center|16
|align=center|30
|align=center|4
|align=center|2
|align=center|24
|align=center|13
|align=center|33
|align=center|14
|align=center|Did not enter
|align=center|
|align=center|
|align=center|Withdraws
|}

References

 
Amateur football clubs in Ukraine
Football clubs in Ivano-Frankivsk Oblast
Association football clubs established in 1955
1955 establishments in Ukraine